"I Lost It" is a song written by Jimmy Olander of Diamond Rio and Neil Thrasher and recorded by American country music artist Kenny Chesney. It was released on August 14, 2000 as the first single from Chesney's Greatest Hits compilation album.   It peaked at number 3 in late 2000. Pam Tillis provides background vocals for the song.

In early July 2000, a shipment of the promotional CDs was seized by U.S. Customs at the O'Hare International Airport in Chicago. The singles came packaged with "English Water."

Music video
This was the last Kenny Chesney video that Martin Kahan directed, and produced by Jamie Amos. It was filmed in black-and-white, and premiered on CMT on August 23, 2000, during "The CMT Delivery Room". It was filmed on location at the Westin Resort, in St. John, U.S. Virgin Islands.

Chart positions

Year-end charts

Notes

References

2000 singles
2000 songs
Kenny Chesney songs
Pam Tillis songs
Songs written by Neil Thrasher
Song recordings produced by Buddy Cannon
Song recordings produced by Norro Wilson
BNA Records singles
Black-and-white music videos